The Saskatchewan Indian Institute of Technologies (SIIT) is a First Nations-operated post-secondary institution offering training and educational programs in Saskatchewan, Canada.

Campus
As of 2021, SIIT has three campuses, nine Career Centres, two mobile job connection and training units, and over 35 community learning sites throughout the province.

Governance
It is governed by a Board of First Nation Chiefs, Tribal Council appointees and an executive member of the Federation of Sovereign Indigenous Nations. SIIT also a non profit organization that operates within the provincial post-secondary system.

History
SIIT was established in 1976 as the Saskatchewan Indian Community College, and assumed its present name in 1985. On July 1, 2000, the Saskatchewan government recognized SIIT as a post-secondary institution through the enactment of the Saskatchewan Indian Institute of Technologies Act.

See also
 Higher education in Saskatchewan
 List of agricultural universities and colleges
 List of colleges in Canada#Saskatchewan

References

External links
 http://www.siit.ca/
 http://www.fsin.com

Educational institutions established in 1976
Vocational education in Canada
First Nations in Saskatchewan
Colleges in Saskatchewan
First Nations education
Indigenous universities and colleges in North America
1976 establishments in Saskatchewan